Wreck is the seventh album by Unsane, released on March 20, 2012, through Alternative Tentacles.

Track listing

Personnel 
Unsane
Dave Curran – bass guitar, additional vocals, design
Vincent Signorelli – drums
Chris Spencer – vocals, guitar, photography
Production and additional personnel
Carl Saff – mastering
Andrew Schneider – production, mixing, recording
Unsane – production
Jammi York – photography

References

External links 
 

2012 albums
Alternative Tentacles albums
Unsane albums